Sedum caeruleum, the sky stone-crop, baby-blue stone-crop or red-leaf, is a species of Sedum from the family Crassulaceae. It is native to northwest Africa, Sardinia, Corsica, and Sicily. The plant is a short, bushy annual with pale blue flowers. The leaves are narrowly oblong and usually tinted red.

References

caeruleum
Plants described in 1771
Taxa named by Carl Linnaeus
Flora of Malta